Martina Navratilova and Pam Shriver were the defending champions and successfully defended their title, by defeating Candy Reynolds and Paula Smith 6–4, 7–5 in the final.

Seeds
Both seeds received a bye to the semifinals.
  Rosemary Casals /  Wendy Turnbull (semifinals)
  Martina Navratilova /  Pam Shriver (champions)

Draw

Draw

References
 Official results archive (ITF)

1982 WTA Tour